The 1993 Britannic Assurance County Championship was the 94th officially organised running of the County Championship. Middlesex won the Championship title.

The season format switched to a logical one where only one match was played against each county resulting in 17 games played. This was the first time in the history of the Championship that this happened, although in 1892 there had been two matches against each county with the format of home and away matches. From 1993 onwards all matches were scheduled to take place over four days; this was a change from the format in place from 1988 to 1992 where a mixture of three- and four-day matches were played.

Table
16 points for a win
8 points to each side for a tie
8 points to side still batting in a match in which scores finish level
Bonus points awarded in first 120 overs of first innings
Batting: 200 runs - 1 point, 250 runs - 2 points 300 runs - 3 points, 350 runs - 4 points
Bowling: 3-4 wickets - 1 point, 5-6 wickets - 2 points 7-8 wickets - 3 points, 9-10 wickets - 4 points
No bonus points awarded in a match starting with less than 8 hours' play remaining. A one-innings match is played, with the winner gaining 12 points.
Position determined by points gained. If equal, then decided on most wins.

References

1993 in English cricket
County Championship seasons